Octopodichnus (‘eight-footed trace’) is a Permian to Jurassic trace fossil that has been found in the western United States.

The ichnogenus is characterized by alternating groups of four tracks. These are interpreted as tracks of spiders or scorpions.

References

Arthropod trace fossils
Arachnids